Club Deportivo Ensidesa is a former Spanish football team based in  Asturias.

History
Ensidesa was founded in 1956, as Club Deportivo Llaranes. The club carried this name until 1965, being then bought by company  and renamed as Club Deportivo Ensidesa.

The Club Played In Segunda Division for one season in 1975-76 but were relegated straight back after finishing 18th.

In 1983, Ensidesa was merged with Real Avilés CF. The latter was renamed into Real Avilés Industrial CF.

Club names
Club Deportivo Llaranes - (1956–65)
Club Deportivo Ensidesa - (1965–83)

Seasons
Llaranes:

Ensidesa:

1 seasons in Segunda División
5 seasons in Segunda División B
16 seasons in Tercera División

References

 
Association football clubs established in 1956
Association football clubs disestablished in 1983
Defunct football clubs in Asturias
Real Avilés CF
Sport in Avilés
1956 establishments in Spain
1983 disestablishments in Spain
Segunda División clubs